The 1898 Montana football team represented the University of Montana in the 1898 college football season. They were led by first-year head coach Benjamin F. Searight, and finished the season with a record of three wins and two losses (3–2).

Schedule

References

Montana
Montana Grizzlies football seasons
Montana football